Samu Isosalo (born June 10, 1981) is a Finnish former professional ice hockey player.  He played in the SM-liiga for Lukko and currently works as an assistant coach for the Lukko U-20 team.  He was drafted 230th overall by the Atlanta Thrashers in the 2000 NHL Entry Draft.

Career statistics

External links

1981 births
Living people
Atlanta Thrashers draft picks
Finnish ice hockey centres
Lukko players
North Bay Centennials players
Nybro Vikings players
People from Rauma, Finland
Sportspeople from Satakunta